Strumigenys xenos is a species of ant in the subfamily Myrmicinae. It is found in Australia and New Zealand. Its IUCN Red List status was last updated in 01 August 1996, and could be outdated.

References

External links

Myrmicinae
Insects described in 1955
Hymenoptera of Australia
Taxonomy articles created by Polbot

Hymenoptera of New Zealand
Ants of New Zealand